Edward Jarvis may refer to:

 Edward Jarvis (businessman) (died c. 1800), Hudson's Bay Company factor and explorer
 Edward Jarvis (physician) (1803–1884), American physician
 Edward B. Jarvis, British film editor
 Edward "Cookie" Jarvis, Competitive eater
 Edward James Jarvis (1788–1852), Canadian lawyer, judge, and politician
 Edward Jarvis (author), British author of religious history and theology